SFWA may refer to:
Science Fiction and Fantasy Writers Association
Scottish Football Writers' Association